Primorac is a common family name found in Croatia, Bosnia and Herzegovina and Serbia.

It may refer to:

Boro Primorac (b. 1954), Bosnian association football coach
Dragan Primorac (b. 1965), Croatian forensic scientist and former science minister
Igor Primorac, Croatian philosopher
Ivana Primorac, Croatian-British make-up artist
Jure Primorac (b. 1981), Croatian footballer 
Karlo Primorac (b. 1984), Croatian footballer
Rafael Primorac (b. 1954), Croatian film producer
Zoran Primorac (b. 1969), Croatian table tennis player

It may also refer to:
NK Primorac 1929, Croatian association football club
HNK Primorac Biograd na Moru, Croatian association football club
VK Primorac Kotor, Montenegrin water polo club

Croatian surnames
Serbian surnames